Biathlon at the 2022 Winter Olympics was held at the National Biathlon Centre, in the Zhangjiakou cluster of competition venues,  north of Beijing, at an elevation of , from 5 to 18 February 2022.

A total of 210 quota spots (110 per gender) were distributed to the sport, a decline of 20 from the 2018 Winter Olympics. A total of 11 events were contested, five for men, five for women and one mixed.

Qualification

A total quota of 210 athletes are allowed at the Games (105 both men and women). The first 93 quota allocations, per gender, will be assigned using a combination of the Nation Cup scores of their top 3 athletes in their best six sprints, one individual, three relays, one mixed relay, and one single mixed relay.  These results will come during the 2020–21 Biathlon World Cup and 2021–22 Biathlon World Cups seasons, up until 16 January 2022. The final 12 spots, per gender, will be allocated using the IBU Qualifying Points List, to nations who have not qualified any athletes yet, with a maximum of two per nation.

On 16 January 2022, NOCs ranked 1-3 will qualify six athletes, 4-10 five athletes, and 11-20 four athletes, for both male and female competitions.  The final twelve spots in each gender are filled individually from the IBU Qualifying points list to a maximum of two for a nation, from nations not already qualified.  Two of these spots will be used by the host if not already qualified.  The host may only start in the relay competitions that they have enough qualified athletes for.  Reallocation of unused quotas will be from the IBU Qualifying points list for nations that have not yet qualified, or only have one qualifier.  For each event a maximum of 4 athletes per NOC may compete, except the Mass Start in which it remains possible to qualify up to 6.

Competition schedule
The following is the competition schedule for all eleven events.

All times are in local time (UTC+8), according to the official schedule correct as of March 2021. This schedule may be subject to change in due time.

Medal summary

Medal table

Men's events

Women's events

Mixed event

Participating nations
A total of 213 athletes from 30 nations (including the IOC's designation of ROC for the Russian Olympic Committee) qualified to participate.

The numbers in parenthesis represents the number of participants entered.

References

External links
Official Results Book – Biathlon

2022 Winter Olympics
2022 Winter Olympics events
 
Olympics
Olympics